Syntomeida ipomoeae, the yellow-banded wasp moth or orange-banded wasp moth, is a moth in the subfamily Arctiinae. It was described by Thaddeus William Harris in 1839. It is found in the US states of Florida and Georgia.

References

Moths described in 1839
Euchromiina